Vinod Kumar Saroj (born 1 July 1980) is a politician from Bela Pratapgarh, India. Since 2007, he has been elected on three occasions as an independent Member of the Legislative Assembly, representing the Babaganj assembly constituency of Pratapgarh, Uttar Pradesh.

Education and background 
Saroj was born on 1 July 1980 in Pratapgarh. He is son of Ramnath Saroj, who won assembly elections in 1996 and 2002 for Bihar constituency of Pratapgarh.

Career 

Vinod Saroj was elected as a legislator for the first time in 2007 from the Bihar Assembly constituency by a margin of 47.22% votes, defeating nearest Bahujan Samaj Party's candidate Krishna Chand. In Uttar Pradesh assembly elections, 2012, Saroj was re-elected as MLA but from Babaganj assembly constituency and defeated BJP's Mahendra Kumar. He won by a margin of 42060 votes in 2012.

See also 

List of people from Pratapgarh

References

External links
Vinod Saroj
Vinod Saroj on Facebook

1980 births
Living people
People from Pratapgarh, Uttar Pradesh
Uttar Pradesh politicians
Jansatta Dal (Loktantrik) politicians
Uttar Pradesh MLAs 2022–2027